Andreas Alcibiades (born 19 September 1991 in Nicosia) is a Cypriot winger who plays for Ayia Napa in the Cypriot Second Division. 
Despite his relatively young age he has been a regular starter for Olympiakos since 2007 mainly as a right winger and is considered a very promising young talent both for club and country. He has in January 2010 been awarded by the Cyprus media as the most promising young football talent and has thus also been called up to Cyprus national under-21 football team.

External links
Profile at footballdatabase.eu

1991 births
Living people
Cypriot footballers
Association football midfielders
Olympiakos Nicosia players
PAEEK players
Omonia Aradippou players
Othellos Athienou F.C. players
Ayia Napa FC players
Cyprus under-21 international footballers
Cypriot First Division players